Daniel Browning Smith, also known as The Rubberboy (born May 8, 1979), is an American contortionist, actor, television host, comedian, sports entertainer, and a stuntman, who holds the title of the most flexible person in history, owning a total of seven Guinness World Records. Smith owes his flexibility to the genetic condition hypermobile Ehlers–Danlos syndrome.

Early life
Smith was born and raised in Meridian, Mississippi, United States. He has one sister and one brother. He was inspired by contortionists since the age of four, giving him the dream of becoming the world's best one. At this time, Daniel began to jump off the top bunk bed and land in a straddle split, much to the amazement of his family. Later, in his teen years, he began street performing with this technique to attract people's attention. When Smith turned 18, he joined the Bindlestiff Family Cirkus before beginning contortion training under Master Lu Yi at the San Francisco School of Circus Arts.

Ehlers–Danlos syndrome 
The remarkable flexibility that Smith possesses is due to a genetic condition known as hypermobile Ehlers–Danlos syndrome or hEDS, one of thirteen types of Ehlers–Danlos syndrome. Those affected by this condition often have extremely mobile joints which are vulnerable to dislocation and skin which is easily bruised. While many people with hEDS have severe muscle and bone pain alongside a range of autonomic nervous system and endocrine problems, Smith experiences only moderate pain.

Television

CSI: NY as Lukas Neiman
Carnivàle as Rollo the Rubberboy/Boneless Billy Benson
CSI: Crime Scene Investigation as Sqweegel
Monk as Danny Chasen
Stan Lee's Superhumans as Host

Filmography
2005 Kiss Kiss Bang Bang as Rubber Boy
2008 You Don't Mess with the Zohan as Real Estate Agent
2012 Foodfight! as Cheasel T. Weasel (motion capture)

References

External links

Living people
Contortionists
21st-century American male actors
American male television actors
People from Meridian, Mississippi
1979 births